The Bahamas women's national under-18 basketball team is a national basketball team of the Bahamas, administered by the Bahamas Basketball Federation.

It represents the country in international under-18 (under age 18) women's basketball competitions.

It appeared at the Centrobasket U18 Championship for Women.

See also
Bahamas women's national basketball team
Bahamas women's national under-17 basketball team
Bahamas men's national under-18 basketball team

References

External links
Bahamas Basketball Records at FIBA Archive

Bahamas national basketball team
Women's national under-18 basketball teams